is a Japanese comedian, TV presenter, radio personality and actor most commonly known as Sanma-san. His talent agency is Yoshimoto Kogyo and his shishô (master) back when he studied rakugo is  Shōfukutei Matsunosuke.

Together with Beat Takeshi and Tamori, Sanma is said to be one of the "Big Three" television comedians of Japan. He is known for his ability to endlessly carry a conversation. His protruding front teeth are often ridiculed, even by himself.

さんまは
元気です
Akashiya married actress Shinobu Otake in September 1988. They met on the set of the drama series Danjo Shichinin Natsumonogatari. At the time, Otake had one son from her previous marriage with her husband who had died. The marriage lasted 4 years as they divorced in September 1992, they remained friends after and the two are sometimes seen on variety television programs together. They had one daughter, Imalu Otake, born in 1989. Imalu went on to become a tarento in 2009 under the name IMALU.

Current TV programs

Present
  (Nippon TV) (1997–Present)
  (MBS TV) (1990–Present)
   (Fuji TV) (2009–Present)
   (Fuji TV) (2015–Present)

Past TV programs

MC/Regular

Nippon TV
  (Yomiuri TV) (1981 - 1982)
  (1982 - 1983)
  (1989 - 1990)
  (1994 - 2011)
  (1997)

TBS TV
  (MBS TV) (1980-1982)
  (1981)
  (1985)
  (MBS TV) (1994)
  (2003)
  (2006-2008)
  (1992 - 1996)
  (1996 - 2014)

TV Asahi
  (1984 - 1985)
  (1985)
  (ABC TV) (1985 - 1986)
  (1986)
  (1993 - 1995)
  (ABC TV) (2006)

TV Tokyo
  (1981 - 1984)
  (1984)

Fuji TV
  (Kansai TV) (1979 - 1980)
  (1980 - 1982)
  (1981)
  (1981 - 1989)
  (Kansai TV) (1983)
  (1984)
  (1984 - 1995, as Friday regular member)
  (1985 - 1988, with real name, Takafumi Sugimoto)
  (Kansai TV) (1985 - 2016)
  (1988 - 2009)
 
  
 
 
 
  (1991 - 2011)
  (1992 - 1993)
  (1993 - 1997)
  (1995)
  (1995)
  (1997 - 1999)
  (1999 - 2001)
  (2000 - 2002)
  (2001 - 2002)
  (2004 - 2006)
  (2011, 2012 (Satellite TV))

TV series
  (TBS, 1986)
  (TBS, 1987)
 Furuhata Ninzaburō (Fuji TV, 1996), Oshimizu
  (TBS, 2007)
 Jimmy: The True Story of a True Idiot (Netflix, 2018), himself

Radio
  (MBS Radio, with Haruna Iikubo and Haruka Kudo)

References

1955 births
Japanese male actors
Japanese comedians
Japanese radio personalities
Japanese television personalities
Living people
Actors from Wakayama Prefecture